Debabrata Barua Paul (born 28 January 1978 in Kishoreganj District, Dhaka) is a Bangladeshi former first-class cricketer active 2001–2003 who played for Chittagong Division and Barisal Division. He was a right-handed batsman and a right-arm medium-fast bowler.

References

1978 births
Bangladeshi Hindus
Living people
Bangladeshi cricketers
Chittagong Division cricketers
Barisal Division cricketers